Dragon Gate may refer to:

Dragon Gate Taoism, sect of Taoism
Dragon Gate (wrestling), Japanese wrestling promotion
Dragon Gate USA, American expansion of Dragon Gate Japan
Team Dragon Gate, former pro wresting tag team of Genki Horiguchi and Masato Yoshino in the defunct WSX
Dragon's Gate, video game
Dragon's Gate (novel), by Laurence Yep
Dragon Gate (San Francisco), gateway to San Francisco's Chinatown
Dragon Gate, gate at the Great Mosque of Kufa
Dragon Gate (Sweden), business/culture center in Sweden
Dragon gate, an architectural feature in Hong Kong skyscrapers

See also
Longmen (disambiguation), dragon gate in Chinese